Novokilmetovo (Yañı Kilmät) is a rural locality (a village) in Baymurzinsky Selsoviet, Mishkinsky District, Bashkortostan, Russia. The population was 151 as of 2010. There are 2 streets.

Geography 
Novokilmetovo is located 47 km northwest of Mishkino (the district's administrative centre) by road. Churayevo is the nearest rural locality.

References 

Rural localities in Mishkinsky District